The Women's sprint competition at the 2017 World Championships was held on 10 February 2017.

Results
The race was started at 14:45.

References

Women's sprint
2017 in Austrian women's sport
Biath